"Bank Account" is a song by Atlanta-based rapper 21 Savage. It was serviced to rhythmic and urban radio on August 8, 2017, as the lead single from his debut studio album Issa Album. 21 Savage wrote and co-produced the song along with Metro Boomin. A music video was released on November 10, 2017. 21 referred to the song as the de facto single of Issa Album. The song contains a sample from the soundtrack album of The Education of Sonny Carson.

Production
On the July 20, 2017 edition of Everyday Struggle, 21 Savage appeared as a guest. When asked about his production on the track, 21 stated, "'Bank Account' was just straight me. Metro just dragged it out to make it long enough for me to rap on and added the little pauses in the beat and bringing the beat back. But the melody, the bass, the sample, the hi-hat; I did all that shit." The song samples the ninth track of The Education of Sonny Carson OST soundtrack, titled "Flashbulbs".

Music video 
The music video was directed by Matthew Swinsky and was released to  YouTube on November 10, 2017.

Critical reception
Jon Caramanica of The New York Times opined that the song is among 21 Savage's "best and most fully realized songs to date." Reviewing the album, Sheldon Pearce of Pitchfork expressed that the song's production's "clean minimalism is one of the surprises", while lyrically its makes "the same banal comment about an increased cash flow," along with the tracks "Dead People" and "Money Convo".

Remix
American rapper Joyner Lucas released a remix of the song onto SoundCloud and YouTube on December 18, 2017.

Charts

Weekly charts

Year-end charts

Certifications

References

External links

2017 songs
2017 singles
Epic Records singles
Songs written by Metro Boomin
21 Savage songs
Songs written by 21 Savage